In the letters to the early Christian churches of Smyrna and Philadelphia in Revelation 2:9 and 3:9, reference is made to a synagogue of Satan (synagoge tou satana), in each case referring to a group persecuting the church "who say they are Jews and are not".

The verse has often been used to justify hatred against all Jews or particular subsets of modern Jews, which academic scholars generally view as ignorant of the biblical context based on the fact that the suspected author of Revelation was likely Jewish.

Passages from Revelation

Other uses
Similar language is found in the Dead Sea Scrolls, where a small persecuted Jewish sect considered the rest of Judaism apostate, and called its persecutors "the lot of Belial" (Satan).

The phrase is also used in a fragment of a lost work on Dioscorus I of Alexandria found at the Monastery of Saint Macarius the Great in 1923 and identified by American theologian William Hatch. Hatch believes the term refers to the Council of Chalcedon, which Dioscorus attended in 451 and from which he was deposed and exiled for his Monophysitism.

In 1653, Quakers Elizabeth Williams and Mary Fisher attacked members of Sidney Sussex College at Cambridge as "Antichrists" and called their college "a Cage of unclean Birds and a Synagogue of Satan." For this, they were publicly flogged.

Billy Graham used the phrase "synagogue of Satan" to refer to the Jews in a private 1973 White House conversation with President Richard Nixon. When tapes of the conversation were released many years later, Graham apologized for what were deemed by many to be antisemitic remarks.

The encyclical Etsi multa, written by Pope Pius IX in 1873, refers to Freemasonry as "the synagogue of Satan".

See also
Antisemitism and the New Testament#Book of Revelation

References

Book of Revelation
Satan
Christianity and antisemitism
Synagogues
New Testament words and phrases